Poecilotheria metallica, also known as the peacock tarantula, is an Old World species of tarantula.  It is the only blue species of the genus Poecilotheria. Like others in its genus it exhibits an intricate fractal-like pattern on the abdomen.  The species' natural habitat is deciduous forest in Andhra Pradesh, in central southern India. It has been classified as Critically endangered by the IUCN.

Description
Poecilotheria metallica has similar intricate geometric body coloration as other Poecilotheria species, but it is the only species in the genus to be covered in blue hair. While it is young, P. metallica is less chromatic, the coloring turns to blue as it matures. This blue is much less significant in the mature males. Males also have more slender bodies, and their legs are longer. The definitive trait of a mature male are the revelation of emboli at the end of their pedipalps following their "mature molt." Females can be determined through molt confirmations before maturity.

Distribution

Surveys of adjacent forest have failed to observe this species. The type specimen was discovered in a railway timber yard in Gooty about 100 km southwest of its known range, but it is believed to have been transported there by train.

Behavior
Poecilotheria metallica's behavior parallels that of many arboreal spiders. In the wild, P. metallica lives in holes of tall trees where it makes asymmetric funnel webs. The primary prey consists of various flying insects. Spiders of this genus may live communally when territory, i.e. the number of holes per tree, is limited. The species is skittish and will try to flee first, and will also flee when light shines upon it, as it is a photosensitive species. Under provocation, however, members of the species may bite.

Longevity
Females typically live for 11 to 12 years, or, in rare instances, for up to 15 years. Males live for 3 to 4 years.

Venom
There has never been a recorded human death from its bite. However, P. metallica's bite is considered medically significant, with venom that may cause intense pain, judging from the experience of keepers bitten by other spiders in the genus. The vast majority are "dry bites," where no venom is injected into the handler. The mechanical effects of the bite can still be worrisome, as an adult's fangs can reach nearly 3/4 of an inch in length. P. metallica can move rapidly and may defend itself when cornered. Venom may produce a heart-rate increase followed by sweating, headache, stinging, cramping, or swelling. Effects can last for up to a week. However in extreme bites from the genus Poecilotheria, effects may still be felt months later.

Coloration
As with other tarantulas with blue hair, the vivid colors of P. metallica are produced by quasi-periodic perforated multilayer nanostructures. Structural colours are usually highly iridescent, changing color when viewed from different angles. Some species of blue tarantulas have hairs with a "special flower-like" structure which may reduce iridescence. Given that many tarantulas express nearly a full suite of opsins found in other colourful spiders with colour vision, blue colors could potentially function in mate-choice or contests for mates.

Common names
P. metallica is also known as the Gooty sapphire ornamental tree spider, Gooty sapphire, and Gooty tarantula. Other common names are metallic tarantula, peacock parachute spider, or peacock tarantula.

As pets
P. metallica has been bred in captivity for ten years and is popular with tarantula enthusiasts. It sometimes priced above $500 in the United States, but as a spiderling is typically between $100 and $200. As with most tarantulas, the spider's sex can influence price - females generally being more expensive because of their longer life. Members of the species are hardy, relatively fast-growing spiders that are generally fed crickets, but may also eat moths, grasshoppers and cockroaches.

This is a very fast, sometimes defensive tarantula that has the potential for medically significant venom.

Conservation
P. metallica is classified as Critically Endangered by the International Union for Conservation of Nature (IUCN) due to its occurrence in a single, small area in which habitat is rapidly degrading due to logging and firewood harvesting. Another threat identified by IUCN assessors is specimen collection for the pet trade.  Population size is unknown, but the combination of its small natural range and the habitat threats indicate a declining population trend.

References

Further reading
 Encyclopedia of Life: P. metallica

External links

P. metallica male at Poecilotheria.com, website by tarantula hobbyists (in German)
P. metallica female at Poecilotheria.com
P. metallica information at Tarantulazone.com

metallica
Spiders of the Indian subcontinent
Endemic fauna of India
Spiders described in 1899